Tresco is a civil parish in the Isles of Scilly, Cornwall, England.  The parish contains 16 buildings that are recorded in the National Heritage List for England as designated listed buildings. Of these, two are listed at Grade II*, the middle grade, and the others are at Grade II, the lowest grade.  The largest island in the parish is Tresco, and the parish also includes Round Island with its listed lighthouse.  The oldest listed building consists of the ruins of a Benedictine priory dating from about 1300.  The island had a strategic importance and this is reflected in its three listed fortifications.  In the 19th century a country house, Tresco Abbey, was built close to the ruins of the priory, and its grounds have been transformed into Tresco Abbey Gardens.  Listed buildings in addition to those mentioned above include houses, farm outbuildings, a church, a monument, and the wall of a former kelp pit.

Key

Buildings

Notes

References

Citations

Sources

Listed buildings in Cornwall
Lists of listed buildings in Cornwall
 
Isles of Scilly-related lists
Listed